Gut Records was a British independent record label, based in Maida Vale in London, England.

Formed in 1991, Gut was founded by Guy Holmes, who had been Head of Promotions at Island Records. The first single released on the label, Right Said Fred's song, "I'm Too Sexy", became a worldwide hit.

In August 2008, the company went bankrupt and its assets sold to Phoenix Music International Ltd.

Artists
Aswad (signed under the Bubblin' imprint)
Crazy Frog (UK only deal, released on the Gusto and Tug imprints)
The Dualers
The Egg (signed under the Gusto imprint for "Love Don't Let Me Go (Walking Away)" with David Guetta)
Fightstar (signed under the Institute Recordings imprint)
 Hairy Diamond 
 Hi_Tack (signed under the Gusto imprint, recordings licensed from The Netherlands)
Tom Jones
The Lisa Marie Experience (signed under the Gusto imprint)
Pulse
Puretone (signed under the Gusto imprint, recordings licensed from Australia)
Right Said Fred (signed under Tug Records)
Jimmy Somerville
Space
Sparks
Stan (signed under the Hug imprint)
Tears for Fears (licensed from New Door Records)
Uniting Nations (signed under the Gusto imprint)

References

British independent record labels
Record labels established in 1991
Pop record labels
1991 establishments in the United Kingdom